Lil Boat is the debut commercial mixtape by American rapper Lil Yachty. It was released on March 9, 2016, by Quality Control Music, Capitol Records and Motown. The mixtape's production was primarily provided by TheGoodPerry, along other record producers such as 1Mind, Earl, Digital Nas and Grandfero; as well as Yachty enlisted the guest appearances from Young Thug, Quavo and Byou, among others.

Background
Yachty first came to prominence in December 2015 when the SoundCloud version of his song "One Night" was used in a viral comedy video. In February 2016, Yachty debuted as a model in Kanye West's Yeezy Season 3 fashion line at Madison Square Garden.

The cover was designed by Mihailo Andic, using stock images and some images obtained from Tumblr.

Critical reception

In a positive review, Nick Henderson of Tiny Mix Tapes wrote that "Lil Boat is the kind of music that does not need to make a case for its own value, only judged on the intangible, absurdist metrics of its self-contained universe." Sheldon Pearce from Pitchfork was more critical and found that the mixtape "makes a grating mess of varying influences."

Complex ranked the mixtape at number 31 on its "Best Albums of 2016" list. Critic Edwin Ortiz wrote that Lil Yachty "carved out his own lane with his debut mixtape" and praised the project for "showcasing his bubble-gum trap approach to hip-hop and his delightfully weird overall individuality." Uproxx ranked the album at number 19 on its "Best Rap Albums of 2016", commenting that "Yachty uses Auto-Tune to polish and blur his sad, vindictive and romantic instincts, steering through choppy waters of adolescence with the same wide-eyed selfishness and wonder of any teenager in America."

Track listing

Notes
  signifies an uncredited co-producer
  "Run / Running" was removed from streaming services after Nintendo copyright claimed its sample.

Sample credits
 "Intro (Just Keep Swimming)" contains a sample of "Just Keep Swimming" from Finding Nemo.
 "Not My Bro" contains a sample of "Killing You", performed by Broods.
 "Good Day" contains a sample of "かけてあげる", performed by Daoko.
 "Run / Running" contains a sample of "File Select" from Super Mario 64.

Charts

References

2016 mixtape albums
Alternative hip hop albums by American artists
Lil Yachty albums
Quality Control Music albums